A super-Jupiter is a gas giant exoplanet that is more massive than the planet Jupiter. For example, companions at the planet–brown dwarf borderline have been called super-Jupiters, such as around the star Kappa Andromedae.

By 2011 there were 180 known super-Jupiters, some hot, some cold. Even though they are more massive than Jupiter, they remain about the same size as Jupiter up to 80 Jupiter masses. This means that their surface gravity and density go up proportionally to their mass. The increased mass compresses the planet due to gravity, thus keeping it from being larger.  In comparison, planets somewhat lighter than Jupiter can be larger, so-called "puffy planets" (gas giants with a large diameter but low density). An example of this may be the exoplanet HAT-P-1b with about half the mass of Jupiter but about 1.38 times larger diameter.

CoRoT-3b, with a mass around 22 Jupiter masses, is predicted to have an average density of 26.4 g/cm3, greater than osmium (22.6 g/cm3), the densest natural element under standard conditions. Extreme compression of matter inside it causes the high density, because it is likely composed mainly of hydrogen. The surface gravity is also high, over 50 times that of Earth.

In 2012, the super-Jupiter Kappa Andromedae b was imaged around the star Kappa Andromedae, orbiting it about 1.8 times the distance at which Neptune orbits the Sun.

See also
 Extrasolar planet
 Ice giant
 Kepler-1704b
 List of planet types
 Red dwarf
 Super-Earth

References

External links 

 Brown dwarfs: Failed stars, super Jupiters (2008)

Types of planet